The Kharkiv Ring Road is a ring road in Kharkiv and Kharkiv Oblast, running mainly along the administrative border of the city.

Reconstruction
As part of Ukraine's preparations for the UEFA Euro 2012, it was planned to repair and modernize the ring road to comply with its I technical category of road quality. On 10 August 2010, its overhaul began, and on 12 November, the road was solemnly opened after reconstruction. The cost of the work amounted to 320 million hryvnia (about $40 million).

References

Ring roads in Ukraine
Roads in Kharkiv Oblast